The Reisling Stakes is an Australian Turf Club Group 2 Thoroughbred horse race, for two-year-old fillies, at set weights, over a distance of 1200 metres, held at Randwick Racecourse in Sydney, Australia in March. Total prize money for the race is A$300,000.

History
The winner of this race receives automatic entry to the ATC Golden Slipper Stakes and the race is considered an important prep test due to the same distance as the Golden Slipper Stakes.

Seven fillies have captured the Reisling – Golden Slipper double: Hartshill (1974), Burst (1992), Merlene (1996), Belle Du Jour (2000), Polar Express (2003), Overreach (2013) and Estijaab (2018)

Name
1973–2001 -  Reisling Slipper Trial 
2002 -  Seppelt Salinger Slipper Trial  
2003–2004 -  Reisling Slipper Trial 
2005–2010 -  Reisling Stakes 
 2011 -  McGrath Foundation Stakes  
 2012 -  Reisling Stakes 
 2013 -  Moët and Chandon Stakes 
 2014 onwards -  Reisling Stakes

Grade

1973–1978 -  Principal Race
1979–1986 -  Listed Race
1980–1985 -  Group 3
1986 onwards - Group 2

Venue

 1973–2007 - Rosehill Gardens Racecourse
 2008 - Canterbury Park Racecourse
 2009–2014 - Rosehill Gardens Racecourse
2015 onwards - Randwick Racecourse

Winners

 2023 - Learning To Fly
 2022 - Seven Veils
 2021 - Glistening
 2020 - Dame Giselle
 2019 - Tenley
 2018 - Estijaab
 2017 - Frolic
 2016 - French Fern
 2015 - English
 2014 - Earthquake
 2013 - Overreach
 2012 - Samaready
 2011 - Elite Falls
 2010 - Military Rose
 2009 - More Joyous
 2008 - Hips Don't Lie
 2007 - Press The Button
 2006 - Pure Energy
 2005 - Fashions Afield
 2004 - Alinghi
 2003 - Polar Success
 2002 - Fatoon
 2001 - Regal Kiss
 2000 - Belle Du Jour
 1999 - Let's Rock Again
 1998 - Manana
 1997 - Rose Of Danehill
 1996 - Merlene
 1995 - Ginzano
 1994 - Moment's Pleasure
 1993 - Star Of Nouvelle
 1992 - Burst
 1991 - Bold Promise
 1990 - Triscay
 1989 - Sunshine Sally
 1988 - Startling Lass
 1987 - Midnight Fever
 1986 - Magic Flute
 1985 - Beach Gown
 1984 - Rass Dancer
 1983 - Purpose
 1982 - Vaindarra           
 1981 - Allez Show          
 1980 - Shaybisc            
 1979 - Lowan Star          
 1978 - Spanish Yacht       
 1977 - Mistress Anne       
 1976 - Bianca              
 1975 - Inner Magic         
 1974 - Hartshill           
 1973 - Favourite Girl

See also
 List of Australian Group races
 Group races

External links 
Reisling Stakes (ATC)

References

Horse races in Australia